Ytringen is a local online and print newspaper in published in Kolvereid, Norway. It covers the Ytre Namdal area, consisting of Nærøysund, Leka, and Bindal. Published in tabloid format, the newspaper has a circulation of 3,038 in 2013. It is owned 49 percent by Helgelands Blad and 47 percent by Trønder-Avisa. It has two weekly issues, on Tuesdays and Fridays.

References

Newspapers published in Norway
Nærøysund
Mass media in Trøndelag
Companies based in Trøndelag